Strangeloop may refer to:

Strange loop, a cyclic structure
Strangeloop Networks
A Strange Loop, a musical
 I Am a Strange Loop, a 2007 book by Douglas Hofstadter